Primorya ussuriensis is a species of true flies in the family Sarcophagidae.

Range
Primorsky Krai, Russia.

References 

Sarcophagidae
Diptera of Asia
Insects described in 1998